Mississippi Grind is a 2015 American comedy-drama film written and directed by Anna Boden and Ryan Fleck. It stars Ryan Reynolds, Ben Mendelsohn, Sienna Miller, Lio Tipton, Robin Weigert, and Alfre Woodard. The film was released by A24 on September 25, 2015.

Plot
Gerry, a struggling gambler and real estate agent, meets Curtis, an itinerant younger gambler, at a casino in Dubuque, Iowa. Curtis buys Gerry a drink; hours later, Gerry returns the favor, leading to a night of heavy drinking.

After an unsuccessful real estate showing, at the dog track, Gerry and Curtis win big, but Gerry gambles it away. At a bar, they drunkenly attempt to bet $1,000 on a game of pool and are kicked out. Curtis tells Gerry it's almost "Machu Picchu time" – a phrase he uses whenever he leaves town. In the parking lot, Gerry is stabbed in an attempted mugging.

Gerry's loan shark, Sam, threatens him to pay the money he owes her. Running into Curtis, Gerry proposes a gambling trip down the Mississippi, culminating in a New Orleans poker game with a $25,000 buy-in. The game is being held by Curtis' former acquaintance, Tony Roundtree. He agrees, spotting Gerry $2,000. Before hitting the road, Gerry steals the petty cash from his office.

Arriving in St. Louis, Curtis reunites with Simone, a prostitute. After Gerry's successful poker session on a riverboat casino, he and Curtis spend the night with Simone and fellow prostitute Vanessa. While Gerry bonds with Vanessa, Simone reminds Curtis she has been taken advantage of by a gambler before, and remains unwilling to run away with him.

In Memphis, Gerry plays well at Texas Hold 'em but loses everything on the final "river" card. Lying to Curtis that he won $7,000, he asks to go to Little Rock to see his ex Dorothy and estranged daughter, Wendy. Wendy is at school; when Dorothy catches him stealing money, she asks him to leave.

Curtis and Gerry go to the Tunica, Mississippi casino, where Curtis' VIP card is rejected; asking Gerry for money, he discovers his lie. Disappointed, Curtis provokes strangers in the bathroom into assaulting Gerry, who later admits to his problems with money, and his belief that Curtis is his good luck charm.

Reaching New Orleans, they sell Gerry's car, going to a horse race, and lose almost everything on a longshot. Curtis splits their funds equally, giving Gerry $100 for a bus ticket home. But then he collects his winnings, $5000, having bet on a different horse instead. Gerry fails to talk his way into the high-stakes poker game using Curtis as his in, as Tony clearly dislikes him and gets punched in the nose. Curtis gets thumped after a pickup basketball game. Offering strangers $100 for a game, he expects them to rob him when he loses and says he has no money; to his surprise they just take the $100. Curtis then visits his mother Cherry, a cabaret performer, leaving her most of his winnings.

At a casino, Gerry bets the last of his money first on a slot machine then on roulette and wins. Curtis arrives at Gerry's blackjack table and loses his remaining money, but Gerry shares his chips. Their winnings continue to grow as they play craps, and Curtis calls Simone, who proclaims his love for her. Convinced they cannot lose, Gerry and Curtis bet their entire $285,000.

Over an expensive dinner, Gerry and Curtis discuss their plans, having won a half-million dollars. Curtis wants a white Cadillac but when asked repeatedly all Gerry can come up with is he wants to do something nice for his daughter.

In the morning, Curtis finds Gerry has gone, leaving his half of the money with a note: "It's Machu Picchu time". Curtis flirts with the hotel clerk; asked if he is going anywhere special, he replies, "Peru", offering to take her with him.

In the final scene, Gerry buys back his car from the dealer he sold it to, telling the man he "got lucky." Sitting in his own car again, he turns it on and hears the gambling tips CD he left in the stereo. As the CD describes the mark of a confident player (sitting back, relaxed shoulders), Gerry's slouching posture transforms into a confident one and an American flag can be seen reflected upside down in the windshield.

Cast
 Ryan Reynolds as Curtis Vaughn
 Ben Mendelsohn as Gerry
 Sienna Miller as Simone
 Lio Tipton as Vanessa
 Alfre Woodard as Sam
 Jayson Warner Smith as Clifford
 Robin Weigert as Dorothy
 Marshall Chapman as Cherry 
 Jane McNeill as Kate
 Indigo as Dora
 James Toback as Tony Roundtree
 Jason Shaffette as Chuck

Production
On August 15, 2012, Jake Gyllenhaal was in talks to join Anna Boden and Ryan Fleck on their gambling project; the duo would direct the film Mississippi Grind penned by themselves. On January 7, 2013, Ben Mendelsohn joined the cast of the film to star opposite Gyllenhaal. On February 1, 2013, it was announced that Panorama Media would produce the road trip drama Mississippi Grind, with Electric City Entertainment producing. On June 27, 2013, Ryan Reynolds joined the cast of the film to play the lead as a gambler, replacing Gyllenhaal in the cast. On November 6, 2013, Sienna Miller agreed to a starring role in the film alongside Reynolds and Mendelsohn, with production to start in January 2014 in New Orleans. On January 8, 2014, there was a casting call for extras to film some scenes at Mobile Greyhound Park in Mobile. On January 27, 2014, Lio Tipton signed on to the film.

Filming
Principal photography began on January 19, 2014 in Mobile, Alabama and went on through March 2014. The shooting was also done in New Orleans and Baton Rouge, Louisiana. On February 4, Reynolds and Miller were spotted filming scenes on the Mississippi River. On March 11, 2014, the crews were spotted filming scenes at Mobile Greyhound Park in Mobile.

Release
The film had its world premiere at the Sundance Film Festival on January 24, 2015. On January 28, 2015, A24 and DirecTV Cinema had acquired distribution rights to the film. The film went onto premiere at the Karlovy Vary International Film Festival on July 4, 2015. and Melbourne International Film Festival on August 1, 2015. The film was released through DirecTV Cinema on August 13, 2015, before being released in a limited release on September 25, 2015. It was scheduled to be released on video on demand on October 13, 2015. It was selected to be screened in the Gala Presentations section of the 2015 Toronto International Film Festival.

Critical reception
On Rotten Tomatoes, the film holds an approval rating of 91% based on reviews from 121 critics, with an average rating of 7.3/10. The website's critics consensus reads, "Well-acted and steeped in Southern atmosphere, Mississippi Grind is a road movie and addiction drama that transcends each of its well-worn genres." 
Metacritic, which uses a weighted average, assigns a score of 77 out of 100 based on 27 critics, indicating "generally favorable reviews".

Notes

References

External links
 
 Official screenplay

2015 films
2015 independent films
2015 comedy-drama films
2010s American films
2010s buddy comedy-drama films
2010s English-language films
2010s road comedy-drama films
American buddy comedy-drama films
American road comedy-drama films
A24 (company) films
Films directed by Anna Boden
Films directed by Ryan Fleck
Films scored by Scott Bomar
Films set in Arkansas
Films set in Memphis, Tennessee
Films set in New Orleans
Films set in St. Louis
Films shot in Mobile, Alabama
Films shot in New Orleans
Films about gambling
Films about poker